On August 25, 2019, three partygoers were killed and four others were wounded after arguments occurred at a party in Hobbs, New Mexico. Bishop Henderson, a 19/20-year-old male DJ at the party, was arrested and only initially charged for non-fatally shooting one person. The victims mainly came from other areas outside of New Mexico, and were in their late teens to mid-twenties. In 2022, Henderson was acquitted of all additional charges related to the shooting, including three counts of murder.

References

2019 mass shootings in the United States
Mass shootings in New Mexico